A feeder line is a peripheral route or branch in a network, which connects smaller or more remote nodes with a route or branch carrying heavier traffic. The term is applicable to any system based on a hierarchical network.

In telecommunications, a feeder line branches from a main line or trunk line.

In electrical engineering, a feeder line is a type of transmission line. In addition Feeders are the power lines through which electricity is transmitted in power systems. Feeder transmits power from Generating station or substation to the distribution points. They are similar to distributors except the fact that there is no intermediate tapping done and hence the current flow remains same at the sending as well as the receiving end. In radio engineering, a feeder connects radio equipment to an antenna, usually open wire (air-insulated wire line) or twin-lead from a shortwave transmitter. In power engineering, a feeder line is part of an electric distribution network, usually a radial circuit of intermediate voltage.

The concept of feeder lines is also important in public transportation. The term is particularly used in US air travel and rail transport. Efficient, high-capacity routes connect important nodes while feeder lines connect these nodes to departure and destination points.

See also
 Feeder link

Power engineering
Public transport
Network topology